Høruphav is a small town located on the island of Als in south Denmark, in Sønderborg Municipality.

Before 2007, the town was the seat of the Sydals Municipality.

Notable people 
 Christian Gerthsen (1894 in Hörup, Alsen – 1956) a Danish-German physicist

References 

Cities and towns in the Region of Southern Denmark
Sønderborg Municipality
Als (island)